Germaine Roger (1910–1975) was a French actress and operetta singer.

Selected filmography
 Tossing Ship (1932)
 Student's Hotel (1932)
 A Weak Woman (1933)
 Three Sailors (1934)
 Excursion Train (1936)
 Jacques and Jacotte (1936)

References

Bibliography
 Goble, Alan. The Complete Index to Literary Sources in Film. Walter de Gruyter, 1999.

External links 

1910 births
1975 deaths
Actresses from Marseille
French film actresses
French sopranos
20th-century French women singers
Musicians from Marseille